Pionersky (masculine), Pionerskaya (feminine), or Pionerskoye (neuter) may refer to:
Pionersky, Kaliningrad Oblast, a town in Kaliningrad Oblast, Russia
Pionersky, Khanty-Mansi Autonomous Okrug, an urban-type settlement in Khanty-Mansi Autonomous Okrug, Russia
Pionersky, Sverdlovsk Oblast, an urban-type settlement in Sverdlovsk Oblast, Russia
Pionerskaya metro station (disambiguation), name of several metro stations in Russia
Pionerskaya railway station, name of closed railway stations in Saint Peterburg, Russia.
Pionerskaya Station (Antarctica), a Soviet station in Antarctica
Pionerskoye, a rural locality in Leningrad Oblast, Russia